François Pluchart (5 August 1937 – 27 November 1988) was a French art critic and journalist.
He was one of the theorists of Body art in France, with artists like Michel Journiac and Gina Pane and founded the art journal ArTitudes.

References

1988 deaths
1937 births
French art critics
French magazine founders
People from Montmorency, Val-d'Oise